Pulp may refer to:
 Pulp (fruit), the inner flesh of fruit

Engineering
 Dissolving pulp, highly purified cellulose used in fibre and film manufacture
 Pulp (paper), the fibrous material used to make paper
 Molded pulp, a packaging material
 Ore pulp, a mixture of finely ground ore, water, and chemicals used in the froth flotation process for mineral processing.

Biology and medics
 Pulp (finger)
 Pulp (spleen)
 Pulp (tooth)
 The inner part of a fruit or vegetable
 Beet pulp, a byproduct from the processing of sugar beet which is used as fodder 
 Citrus pulp, the juice vesicles of a citrus fruit

Film
 Pulp (1972 film),  a 1972 British comedy thriller film, directed by Mike Hodges
 Pulp (2012 film), a British comedy film directed by Adam Hamdy and Shaun Magher

Publications
 Pulp magazine (or pulp fiction), inexpensive fiction magazines, published from 1896 to 1950s
 Pulp (Filipino music magazine)
 Pulp (manga magazine), a monthly manga anthology
 Pulp (novel), by Charles Bukowski
 Pulp (student publication), an online publication of the University of Sydney, Australia

Other uses
 Pulp (band), an English rock group
 Pulp (juice), a brand of juice
 Pulp, Wisconsin, an unincorporated community
 Pulp fiction (disambiguation)
 Pretoria University Law Press
 Premium Unleaded Petrol, a high octane, ethanol free mix of hydrocarbons
 Pulp, a term in tennis for when the score is 30–30
 PuLP, support for programming optimization problems using the Python language

See also
 Plup, American Super Smash Bros. player